WASP-3b is an extrasolar planet orbiting the star WASP-3 located approximately 800 light-years away in the constellation Lyra. It was discovered via the transit method by SuperWASP, and follow up radial velocity observations confirmed that WASP-3b is a planet. The planet's mass and radius indicate that it is a gas giant with a similar bulk composition to Jupiter. WASP-3b has such an orbital distance around its star to classify it in the class of planets known as hot Jupiters and has an atmospheric temperature of approximately 1983 K.

WASP-3b undergoes no detectable gravitational tugging from other bodies in this system.

The study in 2012, utilizing a Rossiter–McLaughlin effect, have determined the planetary orbit is probably aligned with the equatorial plane of the star, misalignment equal to 3.3°.

See also
 SuperWASP

References

External links

 WASP Planets 
 WASP-3 light curve using differential photometry

Exoplanets discovered by WASP
Exoplanets discovered in 2007
Giant planets
Hot Jupiters
Transiting exoplanets
Lyra (constellation)